Madavoor Ramachandran (മടവൂർ രാമചന്ദ്രൻ; 1945–2011) was a Malayalam film actor.

Acting career
Paravoor Ramachandran started his acting career as a theatre actor through Perumbavoor Nataka Sala at the age of 17.   Later,  he was an active member of the Kalidasa Kalakendram during 1973-75  and played major roles in many plays. His theatre career spanning around 25 years won him public acclaim.

His first film was Rajasenan's Sathyabhamakkoru Premalekhanam. Later, he became active in cinema and played important roles in films like Dilliwala Rajakumaran, Vasanthiyum Lakshmiyum Pinne Njaanum, Kathanayakan, Thooval Kottaram etc.  He had acted in around 30 films. Yakshiyum Njanum was his last film, which was released in 2010. He had also played major roles in several teleserials.

Personal life
Paravoor Ramachandran is survived by his wife Sathi Kumari and two children.
He was born and lived in Madavoor village in Thiruvananthapuram District.

Filmography
 Sathyabhamakkoru Premalekhanam (1996) as Chandramangalathu Ramavarma
 Dilliwala Rajakumaran (1996)
 Swapna Lokathe Balabhaskaran(1996) as Kaimal 
 Rajaputhran (1996) as Dr. Rahman
 Thooval Kottaram (1996) as Ramabhadran 
Harbour (1996) as Chambakkara Paili
 Superman (1997)
 Kadha Nayakan (1997)
 Kilukil Pamparam (1997)
 Kottapurathe Koottukudumbam (1997) as DIG Ramakrishnan
 Malabaril Ninnoru Manirmaran (1998)
 Sreekrishnapurathe Nakshathrathilakkam (1998)
 F.I.R. (1999) as Home Minister 
 Njangal Santhushtarannu (1999)
 Ezhupunna Tharakan (1999)
 Pranayaksharangal (2001)
 Rasaleela (2001)
 Nariman (2001) as Kuruvila
 Kanal Kireedam (2002)
 Shivam (2002)
 The King Maker Leader (2003)
 Achante Kochumolkku(2003)
  'Cheri (2003)
 Sethurama Iyer CBI as Zachariah (Manikunju)
 Yakshiyum Njanum'' (2009) as Vasudeva Gounder

References

External links
 Paravoor Ramachandran at MSI
 Keral.com article
 Mathrubhumi article
 Janayugam article
 Asianet article
 OneIndia article

1945 births
2011 deaths
Male actors from Kottayam
Indian male film actors
Male actors in Malayalam cinema
20th-century Indian male actors
21st-century Indian male actors